Three Books of Occult Philosophy (De Occulta Philosophia libri III) is Heinrich Cornelius Agrippa's study of occult philosophy, acknowledged as a significant contribution to the Renaissance philosophical discussion concerning the powers of magic, and its relationship with religion. The first book was printed in 1531 in Paris, Cologne, and Antwerp, while the full three volumes first appeared in Cologne in 1533.

The three books deal with elemental, celestial and intellectual magic. The books outline the four elements, astrology, Kabbalah, numerology, angels, names of God, the virtues and relationships with each other as well as methods of utilizing these relationships and laws in medicine, scrying, alchemy, ceremonial magic, origins of what are from the Hebrew, Greek and Chaldean context.

These arguments were common amongst other hermetic philosophers at the time and before. In fact, Agrippa's interpretation of magic is similar to the authors Marsilio Ficino, Pico della Mirandola and Johann Reuchlin's synthesis of magic and religion, and emphasize an exploration of nature.

Editions 

  (Book One only)
 (Book One only; reprint of the Laurence edition)

See also

 Classification of demons
 Grimoire
 Hermetic Qabalah
 The Magus, or Celestial Intelligencer

References

External links 

Three Books of Occult Philosophy (London, 1651) – From the Michigan State University digital collections. PDF.
De occulta philosophia – From the Collections at the Library of Congress
De occulta philosophia. Book 4 – From the Collections at the Library of Congress
Book One - Natural Magic (Chicago: Hahn & Whitehead, 1898) - From the Cornell collection at the Internet Archive
 Selected images from De occulta philosophia From The College of Physicians of Philadelphia Digital Library
The Philosophy of Natural Magic (Chicago: de Laurence, 1913) – From Internet Sacred Text Archive

1531 books
Astrological texts
Christian Kabbalah
Grimoires
Hermetic Qabalah
Kabbalah texts